Honesty is a 1983 album by Curtis Mayfield.

Track listing
All songs written and produced by Curtis Mayfield.

Personnel
Curtis Mayfield - vocals, guitar, backing vocals
Michael Ingram - percussion
Joseph Scott - bass
Rich Tufo - clavinet, electric piano
Theodis Rodgers - organ, piano, synthesizer
Charles "Skip" Lane - alto & baritone saxophone, flute
William Puett - alto saxophone, flute
Curtis Mayfield III - flute
David Arenz - violin
Christopher Rex - cello
Frances Jeffrey - violin
Harry Hagan - trombone
George Rawlin - trumpet
Ronald Mendola - trumpet
Peter Bertolino - viola
Morris Jennings - drums
Nella Rigell-Colson - harp
Jay Norem - harmonica on "Dirty Laundry"
Technical
Richard Wells - engineer
Jim Salvati - cover illustration

References 

1983 albums
Curtis Mayfield albums
Albums produced by Curtis Mayfield